is a former baseball player from Japan. He played for Saitama Seibu Lions and Hanshin Tigers.

References

1981 births
Living people
Baseball people from Kumamoto Prefecture
Japanese baseball players
Nippon Professional Baseball outfielders
Seibu Lions players
Saitama Seibu Lions players
Hanshin Tigers players
Japanese baseball coaches
Nippon Professional Baseball coaches